HGH stands for human growth hormone.

HGH may also refer to:
 Atlantic Air Lift, a French airline
 Hamilton General Hospital, in Ontario, Canada
 Hangzhou Xiaoshan International Airport, in Zhejiang Province, China
 Telegram code for Hangzhou East Railway Station
 Mercury(I) hydride (HgH)
 High Street railway station, New South Wales, Australia
 Helmholtz-Gymnasium Heidelberg, a German secondary school